Ipswich was created a Borough in 1200 by charter of King John.

Prior to 1835, the officers of Ipswich Corporation, at various times, consisted of:
 Two bailiffs
 The high steward
 Coroner
 Twelve portmen
 Twenty-four common council of headboroughs
 An indefinite number of burgesses or freemen
 A recorder
 A town clerk
 Chamberlains
 A water bailiff
 A treasurer
 Clavigers (record keepers who held the keys to the miniment chest)
 Sergeants-at-mace

Municipal Borough of Ipswich
The Municipal Corporations Act 1835 created the Municipal Borough of Ipswich. Following this Act, a mayor was elected, together with a High Steward, Recorder, ten Aldermen and thirty Councillors.
The mayors were as follows:

 1836    Benjamin Brame
 1836-1837    Frederick Francis Seekamp
 1837-1838    Peter Bartholomew Long
 1838-1839    George Green Sampson
 1839-1840    John May (senior)
 1840-1841    Peter Bartholomew Long
 1841-1842    John Chevallier Cobbold
 1842-1843    George Josselyn
 1843-1844    William May
 1844-1845    William Rodwell
 1845-1846    Thomas d'Eye Burroughes
 1846-1847    George Green Sampson
 1847-1848    John May (senior)
 1848-1849    Charles Burton
 1849-1850    Thomas Baldock Ross
 1850-1851    Peter Bartholomew Long
 1851-1852    George Josselyn
 1852-1853    Samuel Harrison Cowell
 1853-1854    Charles Foote Gower
 1854-1855    Peter Bartholomew Long
 1855-1856    George Christopherson
 1856-1857    George Christopherson
 1857-1858    Ebenezer Goddard
 1858-1859    Jeremiah Head
 1859-1860    George Josselyn
 1860-1861    Edward Grimwade
 1862-1863    George Bacon
 1864-1865    Samuel Harrison Cowell
 1865-1866    Ebenezer Goddard
 1866-1867    Robert Charles Ransome
 1867-1868    John Patteson Cobbold
 1868-1869    Edward Packard (senior)
 1869-1870    Edward Grimwade
 1870-1871    George Green Sampson
 1871-1872    George Green Sampson
 1872-1873    Ebenezer Goddard 
 1873-1875    Dr Barrington Chevallier
 1875-1876    George Calver Mason
 1876-1877    Walter Turner
 1877-1878    Charles Henry Cowell
 1878-1879    Alexander Francis Nicholson
 1879-1880    David Henry Booth
 1880-1881    Alfred Wrinch
 1881-1882    Frederick Fish
 1882-1883    Edward Rush Turner
 1883         John May Jnr
 1884-1885    Sterling Westhorp
 1885-1886    Benjamin Page Grimsey
 1886-1887    Edward Packard (junior)
 1887-1888    Robert Maplestone Miller
 1888-1889    John Henry Josselyn

County Borough of Ipswich
Following the enactment of the Local Government Act 1888 the County Borough of Ipswich was created with the rest of Suffolk being divided into the administrative counties of East and West Suffolk. The County Borough of Ipswich had the following mayors:

 1889-1890    Nathaniel Catchpole
 1890-1891    Frederick Turner
 1891-1892    Sir Daniel Ford Goddard
 1892-1893    Roderick Donald Fraser
 1893-1894    Samuel Richard Anness
 1894-1895    John Henry Bartlet
 1895-1896    George Francis Josselyn
 1896-1897    Felix Thornley Cobbold
 1897-1898    Robert Stocker Paul
 1898-1899    Edwin Perkins Ridley
 1899-1900    William Churchman
 1900-1901    William Fraser Paul
 1901-1902    Arthur Churchman
 1902-1903    William John Catchpole
 1903-1904    Frederick Bennett
 1904-1905    John Henry Grimwade
 1905-1906    Bunnell H Burton
 1906-1907    William Orford White
 1907-1908    Harry W Raffe
 1908-1909    Francis Charles Ward
 1909-1910    Alexander Gibb
 1910-1911    Peter Wyndham Cobbold
 1911-1912    Frederick Edward Rands
 1912-1913    Edward Colby Ransome
 1913-1914    William Pipe
 1914-1915    John Dupuis Cobbold
 1915-1916    Sydney Brand
 1916-1917    Valentine Desborough Colchester
 1917-1918    Henry Dixon Phillips
 1918-1919    Edward Colby Ransome
 1919-1920    Frederick Edward Rands
 1920-1921    Frank John Mason
 1921-1922    William Pipe
 1922-1923    Alfred Sizer
 1923-1924    John Richard Staddon
 1924-1925    Frederick William Turner
 1925-1926    Kavas Jamas Badshah
 1926-1927    Charles Ernest Tempest
 1927-1928    William Rowley Elliston
 1928-1929    James Francis Clark Hossack
 1929-1930    Arthur Lewis Clouting
 1930-1931    Sidney Charles Grimwade
 1931-1933    George William Senton
 1933-1934    Robert Frederick Jackson
 1934-1935    George Ambrose Mallett
 1935-1936    Hubert Ernest Holland
 1936-1937    Albert Victor Smith
 1937-1938    George Underwood
 1938-1939    Edward Lawrence Hunt
 1940-1941    Robert Frederick Jackson
 1942 (Nov-Dec)    Frank John Mason
 1942-1943 (Dec-Nov)    Owen Dudley Phillips
 1943-1944    Charles West English
 1944-1945    Sidney Charles Grimwade
 1945-1946    Frederick Henry Warner
 1946-1947    Mrs Mary Whitmore
 1947-1949    James Barry Cullingham
 1949-1950    Arthur James Cook
 1950-1951    Cyril Catchpole
 1951-1952    Albert John Colthorpe
 1952-1953    James Chalmers
 1953-1954    Mrs Lesley Lewis
 1954-1955    Clifford Gerald Roper
 1955-1956    Christopher Gorden Rushen
 1956-1957    Phineas Weiner Lewis
 1957-1958    Robert Ratcliffe
 1958-1959    George William Pipe
 1959-1960    Richard James Lewis
 1960-1961    Percy John Fowler
 1961-1962    Mrs Charlotte Green
 1962-1963    Arthur Vernon Bishop
 1963-1964    John McClennan Stewart
 1964-1965    Edward Charles Grimwade
 1965-1966    Victor Robert Redvers Francis
 1966-1967    Mrs Marjory Keeble
 1967-1968    Arthur J Lambert
 1968-1969    Owen Sturly Nunn / Mrs Marjorie J Nesby
 1969-1970    Samuel William Teagar Godward
 1970-1971    Wallace Mortimer Morfey
 1971-1972    Cyril George Skinner
 1972-1973    Walter Horace Mulley
 1973-1974    Mrs Ruby Ann Skerritt
 1974-1975    Arthur J Lambert
 1975-1976    Mrs Beryl James
 1976-1977    Hugh R Davis
 1977-1978    David Myer
 1978-1979    Alan Seabrooke
 1979-1980    Eric Grant
 1980-1981    Sydney Mason
 1981-1982    Mrs Ann Smith
 1982-1983    Mrs Beryl James
 1983-1984    Douglas Grimwood
 1984-1985    Peter K Gardiner
 1985-1986    Eric Grant
 1986-1987    Mrs Gillian Auton*
 1987-1988    Derek Warsop
 1988-1989    William A Quinton
 1989-1990    Ms Sheila Baguley
 1990-1991    Jack West
 1991-1992    Kenneth Wilson
 1992-1993    Mrs Joan Cubbin
 1993-1994    Mrs Margaret Alderton
 1994-1995    Ian Roderick Grimwood
 1995-1996    Albert W Grant
 1996-1997    Philip H L Smart
 1997-1998    Mrs Jeannette E Macartney
 1998-1999    George Hamilton Clarke MBE
 1999-2000    John Charles Mowles
 2000-2001    Don Edwards
 2001-2002    Maureen Carrington-Brown
 2002-2003    Richard Risebrow
 2003-2004    Penelope Kathryn Breakwell
 2004-2005    Roger Edwin Fern
 2005-2006    William George Wright
 2006-2007    Henry George Davies
 2007-2008    Inga Elisabeth Lockington
 2008-2009    David Hale
 2009-2010    David Goldsmith
 2010-2011    Jane Chambers
 2011-2012    John Le Grys
 2012-2013    Mary Blake
 2013-2014    Hamil Clarke
 2014-2015    Bill Quinton
 2015-2016    Glen Chisholm
 2016-2017    Roger Fern
 2017-2018    Sarah Barber
 2018-2019    Jane Riley
 2019-2021    Jan Parry**
 2021         Jane Riley***
 2021-2022    Elizabeth Hughes
 2022-        John Cook

Notes
 Mother of Jan Parry, later mayor 2019-2021
Jan Parry was elected Mayor at the annual council meeting in May 2019. Owing to the COVID-19 pandemic she agreed to carry on for a further municipal year. However, she stepped down from the council at the end of January 2021 for family reasons. She was the first mayor who was also the daughter of a former mayor.
 Former Mayor Jane Riley was elected Mayor in February 2021 on an interim basis, and was succeeded by Elizabeth Hughes at annual council meeting in May 2021.

References

Ipswich Borough Council

Ipswich Borough